is a Japanese manga series created by Rū Tatsuki about a spherical cat named Poyo and the family that adopts him. It was adapted into an anime television series in January 2012. The anime is available subtitled in English on Crunchyroll. A video game based on the series in which players raise Poyo was released in April 2012 for the Nintendo 3DS.

Plot 
Poyopoyo revolves around a spherical orange cat named Poyo, and the family that adopts him. The slice of life stories only have very mild continuity between them, and can be taken as stand-alone episodes. Episodes often deal with regular day-to-day interactions between family members, occasionally showing how family members celebrate holidays or deal with everyday inconveniences like rainstorms. At first, younger brother Hide dislikes Poyo, but as the stories continue, we see that Hide has grown somewhat attached to the family pet.

Characters 
 Poyo Satou (voiced by Ikue Otani) An orange, round cat and main character of the series. Most characters adore him.
 Moe Satou (voiced by Suzuko Mimori) is a 22-year-old woman who found Poyo in the street when she was drunk. She is friendly and very careless.
 Hide Satou (voiced by Hidekazu Ichinose) is Moe's younger brother and has a hard time getting along with Poyo. He is 17 and attends high school.
 Shigeru Satou (voiced by Akira Kamiya) is the father of Moe and Hide. A strong and intimidating man.

Media

Manga

Anime

Video game

References

External links
 Official Site for Poyopoyo Kansatsu Nikki Anime
 Poyopoyo Kansatsu Nikki Streaming on Crunchyroll
 

2004 manga
2012 anime television series debuts
2012 video games
Japan-exclusive video games
Nintendo 3DS games
Nintendo 3DS-only games
Slice of life anime and manga
Takeshobo
TV Tokyo original programming
Video games based on anime and manga
Video games developed in Japan
Yonkoma
Takeshobo manga
Studio Deen
Seinen manga